The women's 3000 metres event  at the 1982 European Athletics Indoor Championships was held on 6 March. This was the first time that this event was contested at the European Athletics Indoor Championships.

Results

References

3000 metres at the European Athletics Indoor Championships
3000